Ballerina (titled Leap! in the United States) is a 2016 3D computer-animated musical adventure comedy film co-directed by Éric Summer and Éric Warin and written by Summer, Carol Noble and Laurent Zeitoun. A co-production between Canadian and French companies, the film takes place in 1880s France and follows a poor orphan girl who dreams of becoming a ballerina and gets a chance to audition for the celebrated school of the Paris Opera Ballet.

Ballerina stars the voices of Elle Fanning, Dane DeHaan, Maddie Ziegler and Carly Rae Jepsen. The film was released in cinemas in France and the United Kingdom on 12 December 2016, followed by releases in various countries over the following several months, including Canada on 24 February 2017. The film was released in the United States on 25 August 2017, with the voices of Nat Wolff (who replaced DeHaan), Kate McKinnon and Mel Brooks added. Ballerina received generally mixed reviews from critics, but was a box office success, grossing $106.1 million worldwide against a $30 million budget.

Plot
In the 1880s, eleven-year-old Félicie (Elle Fanning), a poor orphan girl who dreams of becoming a ballerina, but lacks formal training, runs away from her orphanage in rural Brittany with her best friend, Victor (Dane DeHaan), a young inventor. Together they go to Paris, but they soon become separated, and Victor becomes an office boy in Gustave Eiffel's workshop. Félicie finds her way to the Paris Opera, where the guard catches her trespassing. She is rescued by a mysterious cleaner with a limp, Odette (Carly Rae Jepsen), who agrees to let Félicie stay with her until she gets on her feet. Odette works for both the Opera and for the cruel and imperious Régine Le Haut (Julie Khaner), a wealthy restaurant owner. While helping Odette clean, Félicie spies Regine's daughter, Camille (Maddie Ziegler), practicing ballet. Camille sees Félicie, insults her, and throws Félicie's treasured music box out of the window, breaking it. As Félicie takes it to Victor for repair, she intercepts the postman who brings a letter from the Opera admitting Camille to the celebrated school of the Paris Opera Ballet partly because of her mother's connection. In her anger, Félicie hides the letter and decides to assume Camille's identity to get into the school and pursue her dream.

Odette agrees to mentor Félicie, who later learns that Odette was a former prima ballerina. Félicie finds her training very difficult, but with Camille's letter of acceptance, she manages to take her place at the ballet school. Mérante (Terrence Scammell), the school's exacting choreographer, announces that one of the girls from the class will be chosen to dance the role of Clara in The Nutcracker. He dismisses the worst dancer in class each day. Félicie improves each day and narrowly avoids elimination, but a couple of days before the final elimination, her lie is discovered. Mérante decides to admit Camille into the class, while also letting Félicie stay; although Félicie's infraction was serious, Mérante accidentally saw her dance passionately in a bar that she and Victor visited. The night before the final elimination, Félicie neglects training to go out on a date with Rudi, a handsome boy from the school, which disappoints Odette. Victor sees Félicie with Rudi and becomes jealous; he and Félicie argue. The next day, Félicie is late to the audition and unable to perform well, and so the part of Clara goes to Camille.

Regine sends Félicie back to her orphanage, where she loses her spirit. She has a dream about being an infant in the arms of her late mother, a ballerina, who gave her the music box. She decides to return to Paris to help Odette and apologize to Victor. While cleaning the stage, Félicie encounters Camille, and they engage in a dance battle that is witnessed by all the students, Odette and Mérante. Félicie does a grand jeté over a flight of stairs, while Camille cannot. Mérante approaches the two girls and asks them why they dance, to which Camille admits that she dances only because her mother tells her to, while Félicie speaks stirringly of dance as her inheritance and passion. Camille admits that Félicie should dance the role of Clara.

Near Eiffel's workshop, where the Statue of Liberty is being constructed, Félicie invites Victor to the performance. A furiously deranged Régine arrives and chases Félicie up to the crown of the statue, but Victor saves her with aid from Camille and traps Régine in the scaffolding. Arriving at the Opera just in time, Félicie dons Odette's special pointe shoes. Félicie kisses Victor on the cheek, and she performs in The Nutcracker alongside the principal ballerina.

Cast
Elle Fanning as Félicie
Dane DeHaan (Nat Wolff in the American version) as Victor
Carly Rae Jepsen as Odette
Maddie Ziegler as Camille Le Haut
Mel Brooks (American version only) as M. Luteau, the supervisor of the orphanage
Julie Khaner (Kate McKinnon in the American version) as Régine Le Haut, Camille's mother
(McKinnon also voiced the Mother Superior and Félicie's mother in the American version)
Terrence Scammell as Mérante (American version as Janitor as well)
Bronwen Mantel as the Mother Superior, the head of the orphanage

There is also a French language version of the film, with the voices of Camille Cottin as Félicie and Malik Bentalha as Victor, that premiered in France on December 14, 2016.

Production
The film was produced at L'Atelier Animation in Montreal, Quebec, Canada. The filmmakers used key frame animation of Aurélie Dupont and Jérémie Bélingard, two étoiles (star dancers) of the Paris Opera Ballet, to translate realistic dance choreography to the animated film. Dupont became the de facto choreographer of the film's dance sequences.

Music
The soundtrack album was released internationally by Gaumont on December 12, 2016. The album features both the film's original score composed by Klaus Badelt, and songs from other artists that are used in the film. The film also features songs that are not included in the album, such as "Cut to the Feeling" and "Runaways" by Jepsen and "Suitcase" by Sia.

Soundtrack

Release
The film premiered at the Mon premier Festival on October 19, 2016, and it was released in France and the UK in December 2016. Numerous releases followed around the world. Entertainment One Films 
Canada distributed the film in Canada, with the theatrical release beginning on February 24, 2017 in Quebec and March 3, 2017 elsewhere in Canada.

In May 2016, The Weinstein Company acquired distribution rights to the film in the United States. A US release was first scheduled for March 3, 2017, under the title Leap! The release was subsequently pushed back to April 21, 2017, followed by additional casting announcements of Wolff, Brooks, and McKinnon. It was then pushed back to August 30 and later moved up to August 25, 2017.

Reception

Box office
According to Box Office Mojo, Ballerina grossed approximately US$106 million worldwide. It opened in France on 14 December 2016 with over half a million admissions, earning €2.2 million (~US$2.4 million) over the course of the weekend. Its French gross eventually reached $14.5 million. In Canada, it earned more than Can$1.5 million during the first 13 days of its theatrical run, $1.1 million of which was made in Quebec. It ultimately grossed a total of Can$3.6 million (~US$2.8 million) in Canada. It was released on 25 August 2017 in the United States, earning $4.7 million over its opening weekend. It grossed $21.9 million in the US, the film's highest-grossing territory.

Critical response
On review aggregator website Rotten Tomatoes, the original version of the film holds an approval rating of 75% based on 32 reviews, with an average rating of 5.74/10. The critical consensus reads, "Ballerina rich setting and beautifully animated dance sequences elevate a solidly crafted all-ages adventure with a surprising amount of colorful flair." On French entertainment information website AlloCiné, the film has an average grade of 3.5/5, based on 17 critics. On Rotten Tomatoes, the US version of the film, entitled Leap!, has an approval rating of 42% based on 62 reviews, with an average rating of 4.86/10. The critical consensus for the US version reads, "From its bland story to its unremarkable animation, Leap! does little to distinguish itself from a long list of like-minded – and superior – family-friendly alternatives." On Metacritic, which assigns a normalized rating to reviews, the film has a weighted average score 48 out of 100, based on 18 critics, indicating "mixed or average reviews". Audiences polled by CinemaScore gave the film an average grade of "A" on an A+ to F scale.

Melissa Stewart of Insights magazine of Australia called the film "a heart-warming adventure. ... With the animation capturing the elegance of ballet, it is hard not to be mesmerised by the pirouettes and grand jetés. ... [Félicie's] journey will resonate with for anyone who has experienced the sting of failure and trying to figure out how to bounce back. All of this occurs while humour is trickled throughout the movie making it enjoyable for kids and parents alike. ... [T]he themes of fighting for your passion and dreams is timeless." Mike McCahill of The Guardian wrote: "It's attentively, attractively designed – with a real eye for the light hitting the buildings of a city under construction – but a shade more Black Swan in its DNA might have made the happy ending less inevitable and its pep less repetitive." Matt Zoller Seitz of RogerEbert.com gave the film one and a half out of four stars, criticizing its numerous "3-D animation clichés" which he said spoil the potential of its original premise, stating that "The best thing about [Leap!] is its portrayal of the dance world, then and now, as both exhilarating and cruel. ... But [the film] doesn't seem to grasp how special these elements are ...  it keeps wasting [Félicie's] time (and ours) with theoretically comic or suspenseful subplots that we've seen done many times before, with considerably more wit and feeling".

References

External links

Ballerina at Library and Archives Canada

2016 films
2010s adventure comedy films
2010s children's animated films
2010s French animated films
2010s musical comedy films
2016 comedy films
2016 computer-animated films
Animated films about orphans
Animated musical films
Canadian animated feature films
Canadian independent films
Dance animation
StudioCanal films
StudioCanal animated films
Entertainment One films
Films about ballet
Films set in Brittany
Films set in France
Films set in Paris
Films set in the 1880s
Films scored by Klaus Badelt
Gaumont Animation
2010s English-language films
2010s American films
2010s Canadian films
2010s British films